The 180s decade ran from January 1, 180, to December 31, 189.

Significant people
 Commodus, Roman Emperor

References